Brish (Bereş) is a rural locality (a selo) in Assinsky Selsoviet, Beloretsky District, Bashkortostan, Russia. The population was 263 as of 2010. There are 3 streets.

Geography 
Brish is located 124 km northwest of Beloretsk (the district's administrative centre) by road. Brishtamak is the nearest rural locality.

References 

Rural localities in Beloretsky District